Çağlar Ertuğrul (born 5 November 1987) is a Turkish actor and mechanical engineer. He won the Golden Butterfly Award for Best Actor in a Romantic Comedy in 2020 for his role in Afili Aşk and Best Actor in a TV Series in 2021 for his role in Teşkilat. He is regarded as one of the best Turkish actors in the Turkish dramas.

Life and career 
Ertuğrul graduated from Bornova High School and afterwards went to Koç University and gained a university degree in Mechanical Engineering. He later decided to pursue a career in the arts. His first acting job was at a stage play at the Koç University, in Romeolar ve Julietler, 13 April 2009. In 2012, Alper Çağlar directed a military feature film called Dağ and Ertuğrul had the leading role in the film. His first film was a success and he became a well known name directly with his first film. He also acted in a film called Bana Masal Anlatma and had guest roles in the TV series Medcezir and Benim İçin Üzülme.

In 2016, he played the lead role in Dağ 2. The film achieved global recognition and became most watched film of 2016 in Turkey. In 2017, Ertuğrul played a major role in the dramatic series Fazilet Hanım ve Kızları opposite Deniz Baysal, the series received high ratings in Turkey.

In 2019-2020, he played the role of a handsome playboy Kerem Yiğiter in Afili Aşk opposite Burcu Özberk.

Filmography

Theater plays 
 Romeolar ve Julietler
 Yobaz
 Kaos Teorileri
 Leş

Awards and nominations

References

External links 
 

1987 births
Living people
Turkish male film actors
Turkish mechanical engineers
Golden Butterfly Award winners
People from Karşıyaka
Male actors from Istanbul